Amir Aly (born 21 July 1976) is a Swedish songwriter and record producer. He has worked with some of the foremost artists in Sweden, including Jill Johnson, Elena Paparizou, Danny Saucedo, Robin Stjernberg, Sanna Nielsen and Shirley Clamp.

Aly had a total of four songs in the Swedish semifinals to the Eurovision Song Contest (Melodifestivalen) in 2008 and 2009.

In 2009 the Danny Saucedo single "Emely" (co-written by Aly) made it to nr 1 on the Polish charts.

Aly has produced three tracks on the winner of the Eurovision Song Contest 2009, Alexander Rybak's album (Fairytales) - "Funny Little World", "Roll With The Wind" and "If You Were Gone". In 2010, the second album from Alexander Rybak, "No Boundaries", was released, entirely recorded, mixed and produced by Aly at Yla Studios in Malmö, Sweden.

Aly produced the album "Pieces" in 2013, released by runner up in Swedish Idol (2012) Robin Stjernberg (who represented Sweden in the Eurovision Song Contest the same year). It qualified for gold the very first day it was released.

Since 2003, Aly has produced a number of gold and platinum records with Swedish country star Jill Johnson, with their latest collaboration being released in 2014. 

Just before Christmas 2014 the track "Daddy's Still Around" (produced by Aly) was released by Doug Seegers, made famous by the TV-show "Jill's Veranda".

In 2015 Aly will participate with his 8th contribution to the Swedish pre-selections for the ESC.

Selection of artists Aly has produced

 Jill Johnson
Səmra Rəhimli
 Elena Paparizou
 Robin Stjernberg
 Sanna Nielsen
 Shirley Clamp
 Sonja Aldén
 Alexander Rybak
 Maria Haukaas Storeng
 Nanne Grönvall
 Doug Seegers
 Rongedal
 Uno Svenningsson
 Anna Sahlene
 Meredith Brooks
 Liberator
 Elisabeth Carlisle-Hollenbeck
 Jon Strider

Selection of songwriters Aly has co-written with
 Bobby Ljunggren
 Henrik Wikström
 Aleena Gibson
 Fredrik Kempe
 Ingela "Pling" Forsman
 Thomas G:son

References
 Lionheart International
 Lionheart Music
 Article in Sydsvenskan 091014
 Alexander Rybak - No Boundaries

External links
 Swedish Wiki
 Official site

1976 births
Living people
Swedish songwriters